NAIA independent football schools are four-year institutional members of the National Association of Intercollegiate Athletics (NAIA) that play college football independent of any formal conference affiliation.  In sports other than football, these schools compete in a college athletic conference affiliated with the NAIA called Continental Athletic Conference.

NAIA football independents

Current members

Yearly records

NAIA Division II independents (1970–1996)

NAIA independents (1997–present)

See also
 NAIA independent schools

References

Independent
Independent
Independent